Melania Tartabull (born 22 October 1955) is a Cuban volleyball player. She competed in the women's tournament at the 1976 Summer Olympics.

References

External links
 

1955 births
Living people
Cuban women's volleyball players
Olympic volleyball players of Cuba
Volleyball players at the 1976 Summer Olympics
Place of birth missing (living people)
Pan American Games medalists in volleyball
Pan American Games gold medalists for Cuba
Medalists at the 1975 Pan American Games